State Route 73 (SR 73) is an approximately  state highway in Orange County, California. The southernmost  of the highway is a toll road operated by the San Joaquin Hills Transportation Corridor Agency named the San Joaquin Hills Transportation Corridor, which opened in November 1996. The northernmost  of the highway, which opened in 1978, is part of the Corona del Mar Freeway. 
SR 73's southern terminus is at Interstate 5 (I-5) in San Juan Capistrano and its northern terminus is at Interstate 405 (I-405) in Costa Mesa. The highway's alignment through the San Joaquin Hills follows an approximately parallel path between the Pacific Coast Highway and I-405. Currently, there are no HOV lanes for the three-mile freeway segment, but the medians have been designed with sufficient clearance for their construction should the need arise in the future.

Route description
SR 73 begins in northern San Juan Capistrano near the Mission Viejo border at an interchange with I-5. The freeway heads northwest into Laguna Niguel before the tolled portion begins at the Greenfield Drive exit. After passing Greenfield Drive, SR 73 enters Aliso Viejo before entering Laguna Beach, where SR 73 has an interchange with SR 133. Following this, the road passes through Crystal Cove State Park, where the main toll plazas are located. After leaving the state park, SR 73 straddles the border between Irvine and Newport Beach and provides easy access to University of California, Irvine through the Bison Avenue exit. Following the MacArthur Boulevard exit, the tolled part of the road ends and becomes a freeway. SR 73 continues into Newport Beach, running along the southern boundary of Orange County John Wayne Airport (IATA Airport Code SNA). Entering Costa Mesa, SR 73 interchanges with SR 55 before ending at I-405.

SR 73 is part of the California Freeway and Expressway System, and is part of the National Highway System, a network of highways that are considered essential to the country's economy, defense, and mobility by the Federal Highway Administration.

History

Most of SR 73 is a limited-access toll highway designed to reduce congestion within Orange County on the Pacific Coast Highway (SR 1) and the San Diego Freeway (I-5 and I-405) by providing a direct route through the San Joaquin Hills.

SR 73 is not a toll road over its entire length. From its northbound terminus heading southbound, the first  of SR 73 has no tolls and is known as the Corona Del Mar Freeway. SR 73's previous alignment had the freeway portion end at MacArthur Boulevard, and the SR 73 designations ran along with MacArthur south to meet SR 1 in Corona del Mar. Under the current alignment, heading southbound, SR 73 becomes a designated toll road immediately after the Jamboree/MacArthur ramp and remains so until its southern terminus at I-5. Though the next ramp heading southbound (Bison Avenue) is part of the toll road, it is toll-free, as is the first ramp heading northbound from the southern terminus (Greenfield Drive).

The design and construction of the highway cost a total of $800 million. The design and construction was overseen by the San Joaquin Hills Transportation Corridor Agencies, or SJHTCA, an agency formed in 1988 for the express purpose of designing the tollway. Construction was divided into four sections, each with an individual management system and quality control. A joint venture led by Kiewit Pacific Co., a subsidiary of Kiewit Corporation, completed this project in 1996.

SR 73's toll road was the first to be financed with tax-exempt bonds on a stand-alone basis, including construction and environmental risk. In 2011, $2.1 billion in debt for the San Joaquin Hills toll roads was restructured, which pushed back the time until the bonds are paid off and the route becomes a state-owned freeway to 2042. In 2014, the debt was again restructured in an attempt to get improved interest rates, improved debt ratings, and in the process save $44 million in debt repayment. This resulted in another eight years of payments, delaying the pay-off date to 2050.  Under this new plan the debt can be paid off earlier than 2050 if ridership and revenue improve.

Tolls
The tolled portion of SR 73 (beginning after Greenfield Drive in the northbound direction, and starting after the Bison Avenue exit in the southbound direction) employs a barrier toll system, where drivers are charged flat-rate tolls based on what particular toll booths they pass through. Since May 13, 2014, the road has been using an all-electronic, open road tolling system, and on October 2, 2019, the license plate tolling program, under the brand name "ExpressAccount", was discontinued. Drivers may still pay using the FasTrak electronic toll collection system or via a one time payment online. Drivers must pay within 5 days after their trip on the toll road or they will be assessed a toll violation.

Drivers who drive the entire tolled segment of SR 73 will only encounter the Catalina View Mainline toll gantry. , the gantry uses a congestion pricing scheme based on the time of day for FasTrak users, while non-FasTrak drivers must pay the $9.00 maximum toll regardless of the day and time. Tolls are also collected at a flat rate for all drivers at the northbound exits and southbound entrances of La Paz Road ($2.60), Aliso Creek Road ($3.23), and SR 133 ($3.92); and at the southbound exits and northbound entrances of Newport Coast Drive ($3.64) and Bonita Canyon Drive ($2.20).

Exit list

See also

References

External links

 – includes toll information on SR 73 and the other Toll Roads of Orange County
 Project Description at Kiewit
California @ AARoads.com - State Route 73
Caltrans: Route 73 highway conditions
California Highways: SR 73

073
State Route 073
073
Toll roads in California
San Joaquin Hills
Aliso Viejo, California
Costa Mesa, California
Irvine, California
Laguna Niguel, California
Mission Viejo, California
Newport Beach, California